Suicide by pilot is an aviation event in which a pilot deliberately crashes or attempts to crash an aircraft in a suicide attempt, sometimes to kill passengers on board or people on the ground. This is sometimes described as a murder–suicide. It is suspected as being a possible cause of the crashes of several commercial flights and is confirmed as the cause in others. Generally, it is difficult for crash investigators to determine the motives of the pilots, since they sometimes act deliberately to turn off recording devices or otherwise hinder future investigations. As a result, pilot suicide can be difficult to prove with certainty.

Investigators do not qualify aircraft incidents as suicide unless there is compelling evidence that the pilot was doing so. This evidence would include suicide notes, previous attempts, threats of suicide, or a history of mental illness. In a study of pilot suicides from 2002–2013, eight cases were identified as definite suicides, with five additional cases of undetermined cause that may have been suicides. Investigators may work with terrorism experts, checking for links to extremist groups to try to determine whether the suicide was an act of terrorism.

A June 2022 Bloomberg News study of crashes involving Western-built commercial airliners revealed that pilot murder-suicides were the second most prevalent cause of airline crash deaths from 2011 to 2020, and that from 1991 to 2020, deaths due to pilot murder-suicides increased while deaths due to accidental causes significantly decreased. Furthermore, if China Eastern Airlines Flight 5735 is confirmed to be an intentional act, it will mean that deaths due to intentional acts have exceeded all other causes since the start of 2021. However, most cases of suicide by pilot involve general aviation in small aircraft. In most of these, the pilot is the only person on board the aircraft. In about half of the cases, the pilot had used drugs, usually alcohol or anti-depressants, which would normally have led to a flying ban. Many of these pilots have had mental illness histories that they have hidden from regulators.

World War II suicide attacks

During World War II, the Russian aviator Nikolai Gastello was the first Soviet pilot credited with a (later disputed) "fire taran" in a suicide attack by an aircraft on a ground target, although his aircraft had been shot down and was in a rapid partially controllable descent. In the following years there were more suicide attacks; the best known by military aviators are the attacks from the Empire of Japan, called kamikaze, against Allied naval vessels in the closing stages of the Pacific campaign of World War II.

List of declared or suspected pilot suicides
This list excludes World War II suicide attacks on ground targets (see section above).

Legend:

By pilots in control of whole flight

By hijackers

Published studies
A 2016 study published in Aerospace Medicine and Human Performance analyzed suicide and homicide-suicide events involving aircraft. They state, "In aeromedical literature and in the media, these very different events are both described as pilot suicide, but in psychiatry they are considered separate events with distinct risk factors." In the years 1999–2015 the study found 65 cases of pilot suicide (compared to 195 pilot errors) and six cases of passengers who jumped from aircraft. There were 18 cases of homicide-suicide, totaling 732 deaths; of these events, 13 were perpetrated by pilots. Compared to non-aviation samples, a large percentage of pilot suicides in this study were homicide-suicides (17%).

Prevention
U.S. regulations require at least two flight crew members to be in the cockpit at all times for safety reasons, to be able to help in any medical or other emergency, including intervening if a crew member tries to crash the plane. Following the deliberate crash of Germanwings Flight 9525 on March 24, 2015, some European, Canadian and Japanese airlines adopted a two-in-cockpit policy as did all Australian airlines for aircraft with 50 or more passenger seats.

See also
Aviation accidents and incidents
Aviation safety
List of aircraft hijackings, for instances where a hijacker crashed the aircraft
Kamikaze
Vehicle ramming attack
Mental health in aviation
Suicide by cop

References

External links
 Deliberate acts: 5 cases of pilots intentionally crashing at cnn.com
 List of aircraft accidents and incidents intentionally caused by pilots  at aviation-safety.net
 Pilot suicide cases few and far between at canberratimes.com

 
 
Aircraft pilot
Mass murder
Aircraft pilot
Lists of aviation accidents and incidents
Aviation and health
Kamikaze
Aviation risks